Adoxophyes honmai, the summer fruit tortrix, is a species of moth of the family Tortricidae. It is found in Japan, where it has been recorded from Honshu and is possibly also present on Shikoku and Kyushu.

The length of the forewings is 7.3 mm for males and 8 mm for females. The forewings are glossy ochreous-yellowish, suffused with pale brown in males and deep tawny ochreous in females. The hindwings are light ochreous-yellowish.

The larvae feed on various trees and shrubs, including tea.

References

Moths described in 1998
Adoxophyes
Moths of Japan